The New England Blazers were a member of the Major Indoor Lacrosse League (MILL) from 1989 to 1991. They were based in Worcester, Massachusetts, playing at the Worcester Centrum. After the 1991 season, they moved to Boston, Massachusetts, becoming the Boston Blazers.

All time Record

Playoff Results

1989 establishments in Massachusetts
1991 disestablishments in Massachusetts
Defunct National Lacrosse League teams
Defunct sports teams in Massachusetts
Lacrosse clubs established in 1989
Lacrosse clubs disestablished in 1991
Lacrosse teams in Massachusetts
Major Indoor Lacrosse League teams
Sports teams in Worcester, Massachusetts